Black Power is a studio album by Ralph Carney, Daved Hild and Kramer, released in 1994 by Shimmy Disc. Along with newly recorded work, the album also contains selected tracks from their previous effort Happiness Finally Came to Them.

Track listing

Personnel 
Adapted from Black Power liner notes.

Musicians
 Ralph Carney – saxophones, guitars, vocals
 Daved Hild – vocals, cover art
 Kramer – bass guitar, piano, mellotron, Hammond organ, tape, backing vocals, production, engineering

Additional musicians
 Bill Bacon – drums, percussion
 Randolph A. Hudson III – guitar
Production and additional personnel
 DAM – design
 Michael Macioce – photography

Release history

References

External links 
 

1994 albums
Collaborative albums
Albums produced by Kramer (musician)
Kramer (musician) albums
Ralph Carney albums
Daved Hild albums
Shimmy Disc albums